The Son of the Red Corsair (Italian: Il figlio del corsaro rosso) may refer to: 

 The Son of the Red Corsair (novel), a 1908 novel by the Italian writer Emilio Salgari
 The Son of the Red Corsair (1921 film), an Italian silent adventure film directed by Vitale De Stefano
 The Son of the Red Corsair (1943 film), an Italian adventure film directed by Marco Elter
 The Son of the Red Corsair (1959 film), an Italian adventure film directed by Primo Zeglio